Puerto Rico Highway 818 (PR-818) is a road located in Corozal, Puerto Rico. It begins at its junction with PR-159 near downtown Corozal, and ends at Baja del Palo sector in Cibuco barrio.

Major intersections

See also

 List of highways numbered 818

References

External links
 

818
Roads in Corozal, Puerto Rico